The Baltimore City Council is the legislative branch that governs the City of Baltimore and its more than 600,000 citizens.  It has 14 members elected by district and a president elected at-large; all serve four-year terms. The Council holds regular meetings on alternate Monday evenings on the fourth floor of the Baltimore City Hall.  The council has seven standing committees, all of which must have at least three members. As of 2022, the President receives an annual salary of $131,798, the Vice President gets $84,729 and the rest of councillors receive $76,660. The current city council president, Nick Mosby, was sworn on December 10, 2020.

History
During its early history the council was composed exclusively of white, non-Jewish males.

In 1826, the Maryland General Assembly passed the "Jew Bill", which allowed Jews to hold public office in the state. Two leaders in the fight for the law were Jacob I. Cohen Jr. (1789–1869) and Solomon Etting (1764–1847), who subsequently won election to the council and became the first Jewish officeholders in the state.

In 1890, Harry Sythe Cummings was elected to the council, becoming the state's first black elected official. In the 40 years after 1890, six black Republicans won elections to the council.

In 2003, as a result of the ballot initiative, Question P,  the Baltimore City Council went from six three-member districts to 14 single-member districts or from 18 members to 14 members. The council president continued to be elected at-large resulting in a legislative body consisting of a total of 15 members.

Since 1926, Baltimore City elections occurred the year following the gubernatorial cycle with elected officials taking office in the same year as the election. From the 1920s to the 1970s City elections were held in the Spring, with primary elections in March and the general election in May, with the winners also taking office in May. In the 1970s the elections were changed to the Fall, with the primary occurring in September and the general in November and the winners taking office in December. In 2012 the city's elections were moved to coincide with the Presidential election cycle. This changed the 2015 election to 2016 and gave councilmembers elected in 2011 a five-year term.

City Council President

The council president is elected citywide. The council president presides over the council and serves as a voting member. In addition to their role on the council, the council president is also President of the Board of Estimates and serves as ex officio mayor pro tempore. In the event the mayor's office falls vacant, the council president automatically becomes mayor for the balance of the term. If the position of council president is vacant, the members of the council elect the new council president.

† Died in Office
♯ Resigned as Council President

Records
The records of the City Council, dates ranging from 1797 to 1987, reside at the Baltimore City Archives in Record Group BRG16.  The collection includes administrative files, volumes of proceedings, joint council session reports, correspondence, ordinances and resolutions, committee bills, hearing schedules, and other records.

Members of the Baltimore City Council

Past Members of the City Council

*Elected Council President by the council in January 2007. Sharon Green Middleton was elected by the council to fill Rawlings-Blake's seat.

^ Agnes Welch resigned her seat December 2010. The council elected her son William "Pete" Welch to fill her seat in January 2011. He was re-elected in 2011 and lost the primary in 2016.

** Bill Cole resigned his seat on August 30, 2014, to become the president of the Baltimore Development Corporation. Eric Costello was elected by the council in October 2014.

^^Bernard C. "Jack" Young was elected Council President by the council in February 2010. The Council elected former councilman Carl Stokes to the seat.

***Paula Johnson Branch resigned her seat on March 2, 2007. The council elected Vernon Crider to the seat on April 16, 2007, and he lost re-election in the primary later that year.

^^^Brandon Scott was elected Council President by the council on May 6, 2019.

Election results

2020
All 14 seats on the city council are being defended by the Democrats in the 2020 election.

Democrats are also defending the separately elected position of City Council President.

2016
All 14 seats on the city council were retained by the Democrats in the 2016 election.

In addition to retaining absolute control of the City Council, the Democrats held the separately elected position of City Council President.

Notes

References

Government of Baltimore
City councils in the United States